Dhari Legislative Assembly constituency was one of the seventy electoral Uttarakhand Legislative Assembly constituencies of Uttarakhand state in India. It was abolished in 2012 following the delimitation.

Dhari Legislative Assembly constituency was a part of Nainital–Udhamsingh Nagar (Lok Sabha constituency).

Members of Legislative Assembly

References

Former assembly constituencies of Uttarakhand
2002 establishments in Uttarakhand
Constituencies established in 2002